Parabotia is a genus of loaches. Most species in the genus are endemic to China, but P. curtis is from Japan, P. dubius is from Vietnam, and P. mantschuricus is from the Amur River basin.

Species
There are currently 12 recognized species in this genus:
 Parabotia banarescui (Nalbant, 1965)
 Parabotia bimaculatus J. X. Chen, 1980
 Parabotia brevirostris D. G. Zhu & Y. Zhu, 2012
 Parabotia curtus (Temminck & Schlegel, 1846) (Ayumodoki, Kissing Loach)
 Parabotia dubius Kottelat, 2001
 Parabotia fasciatus Dabry de Thiersant, 1872
 Parabotia heterocheilus Zhu & Chen, 2006
 Parabotia kiangsiensis R. L. Liu & Z. Z. Guo, 1986
 Parabotia lijiangensis J. X. Chen, 1980
 Parabotia maculosus (H. W. Wu, 1939)
 Parabotia mantschuricus (L. S. Berg, 1907) (Manchurian spiny loach)
 Parabotia parvus J. X. Chen, 1980

(Note that under nomenclatural rules, this genus must be considered as masculine even though all other genera ending in -botia are considered to be feminine.  See reference for more information.)

References

Botiidae
Fish of Asia